Stages Cycling is headquartered in Portland, Oregon, with manufacturing and R&D based in Boulder, Colorado. In 2012 Stages Cycling launched its first cycling power meter, where power is measured exclusively on the left-crank arm. Now they have a complete line of outdoor cycling power meters compatible with a range of cranks along with an indoor cycling bike.

History 
In 2010 the core design and executive team, with a background in the indoor fitness industry, began developing a tool to change power measurement for indoor-cycling. It was in the indoor fitness market where the first Stages Power Meter was originally brought to life and tested, eventually turning into the outdoor Stages Cycling Meter

The first outdoor meter launched in 2012. Stages Cycling's was the first cycling power meter to use Bluetooth and ANT+ software on a meter allowing it to be easily updated with firmware. The meter also was the first to have Active Temperature Compensation, keeping the meter accurate despite changing climates, without the need to stop pedaling to recalibrate. The meter also employed the use of an accelerometer to measure cadence, eliminating the need for any external sensors, cables or moving parts, which at the time of launch were necessary for many crank-based power measurement devices.

In 2015 Stages Cycling innovated again, launching the first ever carbon power meters allowing riders of carbon cranks to have a meter on their carbon crank. This marked the first ever carbon meter for Campagnolo.

Products

Stages Power Meter 
Stages Cycling Power Meters are 65mm x 30mm x 100mm and weigh under 20g. Circuitry is housed in high-strength ABS-PC housing and adhered to the left crank-arm, preserving the structural integrity of the manufactures crank-arm. Stages Cycling produces its meter on a range of crank arms for all disciplines of cycling. Currently Stages sells and produces meters for cranks by Shimano, FSA, Cannondale, Sram and Campagnolo, as well as their own carbon Stages Power Meter for carbon cranks. The Stages Power Meter crank arm is manufactured by FSA and filled with hollow carbon carbon. It weighs 145 grams. It is compatible with 386EVO drive side cranks as well as SRAM Red 22, SRAM Force 22 and SRAM Rival 22 BB30 road and SRAM Mountain (168mm Q) BB30 drive side cranks. This compatibility is achieved by way of a range of BB30 bottom bracket spindles.

Stages Indoor Bike 
In the spring of 2015 Stages Cycling announced the introduction of a full indoor bike to its line. At first the bike was available only to trainers and clubs. By the end of 2015 the bike would be available for retail purchase.
Stages Indoor Bike is offered in two models SC3 and SC2. Both models include SprintShift, a dual-action resistance adjustment which pairs a traditional micro-adjust dial, seen on other indoor bikes, with a three-position macro-adjust lever. This allows for large, consistent jumps across resistance intervals, allowing for a smoother ride. The bikes also have FitLoc fit adjustment system and use Gates Corporation’s CarbonGlyde drive system and carbon belt drive.

Technology

Measurements
Stages measures power using a meter on the left crank arm that measure Torque and Cadence.

POWER=TORQUExCADENCE

P=2X[(Fx9.8xL)xRx.1047)]

To measure torque, strain gages which are precisely laid along the left crank arm. These gages detect the flex of the crank arm when a downward force is applies. This force is multiplied by 9.8 m/s2 and the length of crank arm are used to determine the force applied to the pedal stroke, known as torque. To measure cadence, Stages Cycling uses an accelerometer. Housed in the circuitry for the meter, this eliminated any need external magnets, sensors, cables or zip ties when measuring cadence. The accelerometer can capture multiple positions per revolution, resulting in more data. Once torque and cadence are collected they are multiplied together to determine the power of a single stroke. This number is then multiplied by 2  with the assumption that both legs produce relatively the same force. This is the key factor that allows Stages Power to exist on one side of the crank, and keeps the meter small and economical. Stages Power Meters are also equipped with Active Temperature Compensation with allows the power meter to compensate for temperature changes that would otherwise affect the stain gages and their ability to accurately measure force. This technology auto-adjusts to keep power readings accurate without the need to recalibrate and stop pedalling. To capture data the meters use ANT+ and Bluetooth protocols. This also allows the meter to be updated at any time.

Innovations
Since the company's inception it has led the power meter market in many innovations and firsts that have been often adopted and emulated industry-wide.

Left Crank Based Power 
Stages Cycling was the first company to develop left-crank based power, applying strain gauges to the crank arm.

ANT+ and Bluetooth 
Stages Cycling was the first company to use both Bluetooth Smart protocol in addition to ANT+. This allowed a true two-way communication between Stages Power meters and smartphones or Bluetooth enabled head units.

Accelerometer 
Stages Cycling was the first meter to use an accelerometer to measure cadence, allowing for the elimination of any external or moving parts in power measurement and collection.

Active Temperature Compensation 
Stages developed Active Temperature Compensation creating the first meter that auto-calibrates for temperature changes without the need to stop pedaling, ensuring power measurement stays accurate.

Carbon Cranks 
At Eurobike in 2015 Stages Cycling launched, becoming the first company to add power to carbon cranks, launching with its own Hollow Carbon filled meter produced by FSA compatible across a variety of carbon cranks, and a meter for with Campagnolo Super Record, Record and Chorus cranks.

Sport sponsorships

References 

Manufacturing companies based in Portland, Oregon